UCTV may refer to:

University of California Television
UCTV (University of Connecticut)